Calytrix birdii is a species of plant in the myrtle family Myrtaceae that is endemic to Western Australia.

It blooms between September and November producing purple star-shaped flowers

Often found on sandplains in the south western Goldfields-Esperance region where it grows in sandy soils.

References

Plants described in 1895
birdii
Flora of Western Australia
Taxa named by Ferdinand von Mueller